is a Japanese manga series written and illustrated by Shinobu Seguchi. It was serialized in Akita Shoten's shōnen manga magazine Weekly Shōnen Champion from February 2011 to February 2018, with its chapters collected in 38 tankōbon volumes.

Publication
Shūjin Riku, written and illustrated by Shinobu Seguchi, was serialized in Akita Shoten's shōnen manga magazine Weekly Shōnen Champion from February 10, 2011, to February 15, 2018. Akita Shoten collected its chapters in thirty-eight tankōbon volumes, released from June 8, 2011, to April 6, 2018.

A gaiden story, titled , was serialized in the same magazine from August 30, 2018, to January 10, 2019. Akita Shoten collected its chapters in two volumes, released on January 8 and March 8, 2019.

References

Further reading

External links
  

Akita Shoten manga
Prisons in anime and manga
Shōnen manga